Allium moly, also known as yellow garlic, golden garlic and lily leek, Is a species of flowering plant in the genus Allium, which also includes the flowering and culinary onions and garlic. A bulbous herbaceous perennial from the
Mediterranean, it is edible and also used as a medicinal and ornamental plant.

Occurrence and appearance
Allium moly is primarily found in Spain and Southern France with additional populations in Italy, Austria, Czech Republic, Algeria, and Morocco.

With lance-shaped grey-green leaves up to 30 cm long, in early summer it produces masses of star-shaped bright yellow flowers in dense umbels. The cultivar ‘Jeannine’ has gained the Royal Horticultural Society’s Award of Garden Merit.

Variants
formerly included
 Allium moly var. ambiguum, now called Allium roseum 
 Allium moly subsp. massaessylum, now called Allium massaessylum 
 Allium moly var. stamineum, now called Allium stamineum 
 Allium moly var. xericiense, now called Allium scorzonerifolium

See also
Moly (herb), mentioned in The Odyssey, from which Linnaeus took the species' name

References 

moly
Garlic
Garden plants of Europe
Medicinal plants of Europe
Plants described in 1753
Taxa named by Carl Linnaeus